Constituency NA-172 (Dera Ghazi Khan-II) was a constituency for the National Assembly of Pakistan. It comprised mainly the city of Dera Ghazi Khan and the tehsil of Kot Chutta. After the 2018 delimitations, these areas have been included in NA-191 (Dera Ghazi Khan-III) and NA-192 (Dera Ghazi Khan-IV) respectively; as a district was allocated an additional constituency after the 2017 Census.

Election 2002 

General elections were held on 10 Oct 2002. Farooq Ahmad Khan Laghari of National Alliance won by 56,343 votes.

Election 2008 

General elections were held on 18 Feb 2008. Farooq Ahmad Khan Laghari of PML-Q won by 45,370 votes.

Election 2013 

General elections were held on 11 May 2013. Hafiz Abdul Kareem of PML-N won by 49,230 votes and became the  member of National Assembly.

References

External links 
Election result's official website

NA-160